El día de las madres ("Mothers' Day") is a 1969 Mexican film. It stars Sara García.

External links
 

1969 films
Mexican drama films
1960s Spanish-language films
1960s Mexican films